Lester Lloyd Coke, commonly known as Jim Brown, was a Jamaican drug lord and the founder of the Jamaican drug gang the Shower Posse based out of the Tivoli Gardens garrison community in West Kingston. Coke was identified by the Netflix documentary ReMastered: Who Shot the Sheriff as present and a party to the shooting of Bob Marley on 3 December 1976.

Shower Posse
Lester Lloyd Coke founded the Shower Posse alongside Vivian Blake after the Tivoli Gardens strongman, Claudius Masop died in the late 1970's. Claudius had been Coke's mentor and his death left Coke as the leader of the Phoenix gang which later became the Shower Posse.

The Shower Posse dealt cocaine and Cannabis across Jamaica and the United States.They are also Tied to a large number of murders in both countries.

Arrest and death
In 1990 Lester Lloyd Coke and other gang members were indicted by the United States Department of Justice, and Coke was arrested by Jamaican authorities.

He was put in the General Penitentiary in Kingston to await extradition to the United States on drug trafficking and murder charges.

In February 1992 shortly after the violent death of his eldest son Mark "Jah T" Coke, a fire broke out in Coke’s cell and he was burned to death. The source of the fire was not identified which led to speculation that he was murdered.

Family
In 1992 Coke's eldest son Mark Coke was shot and killed while riding his motorcycle down Maxfield Avenue in St Andrews.

Coke's daughter who went by the name Mumpi was killed in a shootout where her husband was also shot and killed.

Upon his death, Coke's adopted son Christopher Coke was elected as the new head of the Shower Posse.

References

1992 deaths
Jamaican crime bosses
Shower Posse
Place of birth missing
Date of birth missing
Year of birth missing